Anisoporus is a genus of trematodes in the family Opecoelidae.

Species
Anisoporus cobraeformis Ozaki, 1928
Anisoporus orientalis Madhavi, 1975

Former species
Some species formerly in Anisoporus have been synonymised to other genera. They are:
Anisoporus eucinostomi Manter, 1940, synonymised to Opecoeloides eucinostomi (Manter, 1940) von Wicklen, 1946
Anisoporus manteri Hunninen & Cable, 1940, synonymised to Opecoeloides manteri (Hunninen & Cable, 1940) Hunninen & Cable, 1941
Anisoporus thyrinopsi Manter, 1940, synonymised to Opecoeloides thyrinopsi (Manter, 1940) Skrjabin & Petrov, 1958

References

Opecoelidae
Plagiorchiida genera